Agadam Bagdam Tigdam is an Indian children's television sitcom produced by Contiloe Entertainment and aired on Disney Channel India. It was launched on 18 May 2007 as the third major original production of the network, and Disney's third locally produced live action Hindi language series. The show was planned to be the third of a string of five local productions due to be released within a year and has followed Dhoom Machaao Dhoom. The show is based on the British show My Parents Are Aliens.

Synopsis
The show revolves around the sweet and fun Malhotra family who are actually aliens from Zoltar. They have been on Earth for about 12 years, and each episode is a day in their life trying to hide their identity from their neighbours and friends.
The family consists of Deepak Malhotra, who is a loving working father, his wife Priya Malhotra, their children Sonia and Sunny Malhotra, and their friend Tappu, who is a doting uncle to the children.

Characters

Main

Deepak Malhotra - Kiku Sharda - On Zoltar, Deepak's name is Dingaru. He loves his kids and wife very much and works a 9am to 5pm job, coming home to one of the children's or their uncle's pranks. He is a good chef, but is quite carefree and lazy.
Priya Malhotra, played by Soniya Rakkar - On Zoltar, Priya's name is Pingaru. She loves her kids and always tries to maintain peace between them. She is a bad cook, and loves eating wooden items.
Sonia Malhotra, played by Benazir Shaikh - Sonia is the Malhotra's daughter and the elder sibling. She is very clever, and is often the one to save her family in chaos and maintain their secret. She usually quarrels with Sunny and as a teenage girl, is also sincerely involved in her school activities.
Sunny Malhotra, played by Parth K. Muni - Sunny is the younger and the most troublesome in the household. He loves to irritate his sister and parents and is always up to pranks that could put their lives in danger.
Tappu played by Dilip Joshi - Tappu is a silly fun-loving uncle to the children. He loves to eat mangoes and always ends up blurting out something that could reveal the family's secret life.

Recurring

Rosie, voiced by Guddi Maruti - The neighbour of the Malhotras, she is always dubious of their actions and thinks something is fishy. Her nosy nature lands her and her harmless husband Bobby in the middle of the Malhotras' daily antics.
Bobby, voiced by Rajesh Jais - Rosie's husband, he is a good friend of Deepak and always tries to be a good neighbour, trying to keep his wife from interfering too much.
Sunny's class teacher, voiced by Kurush Deboo 
Katrina, voiced by Manini Mishra - She is Tango's (Sunny's classmate) mother who challenges Priya in cooking with a competition. 
Kingaroo, voiced by Unknown - He is the King of Zoltar of whom Deepak is too scared, and who everyone respects. He often calls in to check on the Malhotras.

Episodes

References

External links

2007 Indian television series debuts
2007 Indian television series endings
Children's television sitcoms
Disney Channel (Indian TV channel) original programming
Hindi language television sitcoms
Indian science fiction television series
Television series about alien visitations